Lakeside Township is the name of some places in the U.S. state of Minnesota:

Lakeside Township, Aitkin County, Minnesota
Lakeside Township, Cottonwood County, Minnesota

See also
Lakeside Township (disambiguation)

Minnesota township disambiguation pages